Lal Bahadur Shastri Stadium may refer to, 

 Lal Bahadur Shastri Stadium, a cricket stadium in the city of Hyderabad, India
 Lal Bahadur Shastri Stadium, a multi-purpose stadium in the city of Kollam, India